Julio César Rosero (born 11 June 1964) is an Ecuadorian footballer. He played in eleven matches for the Ecuador national football team in 1989. He was also part of Ecuador's squad for the 1989 Copa América tournament.

References

External links
 

1964 births
Living people
Ecuadorian footballers
Ecuador international footballers
Place of birth missing (living people)
Association football midfielders
C.D. El Nacional footballers
Barcelona S.C. footballers
S.D. Quito footballers
Ecuadorian football managers